O Tempo e o Vento (Time and the Wind) is a trilogy of novels written by the Brazilian author Erico Verissimo. Confusingly, the first part of the series, O Continente, was translated as Time and the Wind, giving the impression that it is the whole work.

Plot introduction
The series tells the story of two families - Terra and Cambará -, and how they evolve through 200 years of history, from 1745 to 1945. Living in the state of Rio Grande do Sul, in southern Brazil, both families experience the transformations of the country.

The books
The saga is composed of three books, divided in total by seven volumes:

 O Continente (2 volumes)
 O Retrato (2 volumes)
 O Arquipélago (3 volumes)

Major themes
The trilogy tells the story of a traditional family that lives through transformations of the society, so not only the story of that particular family is explored, but also the historical process that took place in that part of Brazil, as in the whole country. Throughout the narrative, historical wars, revolutions, political crises and events are depicted and the characters are part or affected by them.

It's also noticeable that the families depicted to the book (ultimately family, since at a point they are joined by marriage) also go through transformations, departing from poverty in the beginning of the saga, until gaining economic and political prosperity through marriage. Ultimately, the Terra-Cambará family becomes part of a land-owning elite.

Plot summary

O Continente
The first book, entitled O Continente (The Continent), progresses in non-linear chapters. There are seven chapters entitled "O Sobrado" that frame the rest of the action and tell the story of a siege to the Terra-Cambará mansion during the Federalist Revolution.
Between these chapters, the history of the family is told chronologically, since its beginnings up to the time of the siege.

Chapters

O Retrato

O Retrato (The Portrait) is a portrait in flashback of Rodrigo Terra Cambará, a fictional member of the real government of Getúlio Vargas, as a young man. Dr. Rodrigo arrives to his home town of Santa Fé after studying Medicine in Porto Alegre. Initially, he contrasts with his family: his brother Toribio and his father Licurgo are countryside men while Rodrigo listens to operas, reads magazines from Paris, and drinks champagne. Ultimately, however, as he takes his first steps in politics, he exhibits many of the personality traits and vices that will follow him for life.

The title of this book refers to a portrait of Rodrigo Cambará painted by a friend of the doctor, Don Pepe Garcia. The Spanish painter wants to portrait his friend as vigorous and powerful as he is, and when he finishes he states this painting was his masterpiece. In a clever reference to The Picture of Dorian Gray, by Wilde, Rodrigo himself starts a fast decay into savagery and brutality, ending up sick in bed (since the first chapter of the book is set in 1945, we already know that by the start), while his Picture remains just as it was painted to remind him of the man he once was.

Chapters 
The first (Rosa-dos-Ventos) and the last (Uma Vela para o Negrinho) chapters are set in 1945, the present days, showing Dr. Rodrigo back to Santa Fé after the fall of Brazilian's dictator Getúlio Vargas (whom he supported) suffering from a terminal disease. The other two work as flashbacks, telling stories of the man's early adulthood.
 Rosa-dos-Ventos (Wind Rose)
 O Chantecler (The Chanticleer)
 A Sombra do Anjo (The Shadow of the Angel)
 Uma Vela para o Negrinho (A Candle to the Negrinho - the name of a folklore character)

O Arquipélago

In O Arquipélago (The Archipelago), after the fall of the Vargas dictatorship, terminally ill, Dr. Rodrigo Terra Cambará returns to Santa Fé with his fractured family. In flashbacks and conversations, his days as a revolutionary and as a politician in Rio de Janeiro are remembered, just as the remaining members of the decadent family - particularly his son Floriano, a key part of this metafictional novel -  try to rebuild their lives free from the influence of the dying patriarch.

Main characters

O Tempo e o Vento features a huge cast of characters. Most of the notable characters belong to Terra and Cambará families. Some of the most notable are:

 Ana Terra, a strong woman rejected by her family after having a son out of wedlock with the character Pedro Missioneiro, a former indigenous member of the Jesuits missions. Ana is one of the founders of the fictional city of Santa Fé.
 Captain Rodrigo Cambará, a happy, picaresque man of arms, eventually settles in Santa Fé when he marries Bibiana Terra (Ana Terra's granddaughter), thus forming the Terra Cambará family. He died while trying to take over the very Santa Fé where he lived in during the Ragamuffin War.
 Licurgo Terra Cambará, long-living patriarch of the family and political leader of his city and grandson to Captain Rodrigo Cambará and Bibiana Terra. Married his cousin Alice Terra. Killed in action during the revolution of 1923.
 Maria Valéria Terra (Dinda, or Godmother), single strong and independent woman who lives in the Townhouse since his sister Alice married Licurgo. In the second and third books, she takes over the role of Bibiana as the great matriarch of the family, quiet but extremely wise.
 Dr. Rodrigo Terra Cambará, son of Licurgo and grandson to Captain Rodrigo, takes over his father's role as political leader. Fights in the successful revolution that took Getúlio Vargas to power, thus granting him a high position in the federal government. By nature a bon vivant and a liberal, he abandons his political convictions for the conveniences granted to him by his continued support of the Vargas government as it develops into a violent, long populist dictatorship.
 Floriano Terra Cambará, older son of Dr. Rodrigo, an introspective writer who is an alter-ego of the very Erico Verissimo, writer of O Tempo e o Vento.

Allusions and references to history

O Tempo e o Vento is a historical novel. As such, many of its supporting characters and most of the historical events actually existed. This included, most notably, the Ragamuffin War and the Vargas dictatorship, and the political leaders Borges de Medeiros, Pinheiro Machado, Flores da Cunha, Júlio de Castilhos, Luís Carlos Prestes and many others. All of the revolutions are real, as are the wars of colonial Brazil against Spanish Argentina and the Paraguayan War. 

The city of Santa Fé and the Terra Cambará family are entirely fictional. While the history of Santa Fé is typical of many other cities and towns in the Southern of Brazil, specially Cruz Alta, where Verissimo grew up, the Terra Cambará family is not based on any historical family in particular.

Criticism and References
Chaves, Flávio Loureiro. Erico Verissimo: Realismo e Sociedade. 2a ed. Porto Alegre: Mercado Aberto, 1981.
Fresnot, Daniel. O Pensamento Político de Erico Verissimo. Rio de Janeiro: Graal, 1977.
Hulet, Claude L. "Érico Veríssimo." Latin American Writers. Eds. Carlos A. Solé and Maria Isabel Abreu. New York: Charles Scribner's Sons, 1989. v. 3.
Young, Theodore Robert, O Questionamento da História em "O Tempo e o Vento" de Erico Verissimo. Lajeado: Univates, 1997.
Zilberman, Regina. "O Tempo e o Vento: história, mito, literatura." Letras de Hoje (PUCRS) set. 1986. p. 63-89.

Brazilian novels
Novel series
Family saga novels